Marquez Branson (born February 14, 1987) is a former American football tight end. He was signed by the Denver Broncos as an undrafted free agent in 2009. He played college football at Central Arkansas.

Branson has also been a member of the Atlanta Falcons.

Professional career

Atlanta Falcons
Branson was signed to the Atlanta Falcons' practice squad on October 28, 2010. The team signed him to a reserve/future contract on January 18, 2011. He was waived on September 2, and re-signed to the Falcons' practice squad three days later. On September 15, Branson was placed on the practice squad injured list.

External links
 Atlanta Falcons bio

1987 births
Living people
People from Palmdale, California
Players of American football from California
Sportspeople from Los Angeles County, California
American football tight ends
Central Arkansas Bears football players
Atlanta Falcons players
Sportspeople from Starkville, Mississippi